Pyralis perversalis is a species of snout moth. It is found from the Czech Republic, Slovakia, Hungary and Romania east into Asia, including Kazakhstan, Mongolia and Russia.

The wingspan is about 16 mm.

References

Moths described in 1849
Pyralini
Moths of Europe
Moths of Asia